Prostitution is legal in Belgium, but related activities such as organising prostitution and other forms of pimping are illegal. Enforcement varies, and in some areas brothels are unofficially tolerated.

Most of the red-light districts (RLDs) in Belgium are made up of windows (where the prostitutes sit, usually scantily dressed, trying to entice customers in) although some street prostitution does occur.

Red-light districts by city

Brussels

The main red light district in Brussels is north of the Gare du Nord. In Rue d'Aerschot, Rue de Brabant and the surrounding side-streets there are sex shops and many windows where prostitutes sit. Most of the prostitutes near the Gare du Nord, including Rue d'Aerschot, are Romanian and Bulgarian. Further away from the station the girls are more from Ghana and Nigeria.

The Alhambra Quarter of Brussels (South-west of the Gare du Nord) has traditionally been an area where street prostitution has occurred. There have been numerous attempts to ban street prostitution from the area. In 2012, new regulations were introduced to restrict the girls and also to punish kerb-crawlers. A new city regulation in 2016 banned the prostitutes from the area and proposed a new tolerance zone nearer the Gare du Nord. This was overturned by the Council of State at the end of 2016.

A second, smaller area of street prostitution is along Avenue Louise, where street walkers ply their trade at night.

Gay prostitution occurs around the Place Fontainas.

Antwerp
In Antwerp prostitution is only permitted in the area bounded by Verversrui, Vingerlingstraat and Schippersstraat, locally knows as 'schipperskwartier' (shipper's quarters).

Prostitution in the city was previously run by gangs and violence was common. In the year 2000 the city, led by the mayor, started a clean-up operation. The areas in which prostitution was allowed was reduced to the Schipperskwartier, and a permit system was introduced. The permits for owners of the windows have to be personally signed by the mayor. This helps to keep organised crime out of the area.

The area was refurbished and pedestrianised in an attempt to get away from the previous seedy-looking image. Usually, windows in red light districts are isolated from one another, but the windows here are interconnected in groups of 3, 5 or 7 so the prostitutes may socialise with each other and also aid each other in the event of trouble with a client. There is a small police station within the area, but the police keep a low profile.

Between Verversrui and Schippersstraat is the Villa Tinto. Previously an industrial building, it has been converted by architect Arne Quinze and Flemish interior designers into a complex with 51 windows on the ground floor with a doctor's practice and bed & breakfast rooms above. The project was set up by Franky De Coninck, a respected Belgian businessman. It has been called "Europe's most high tech bordello". Opened in 2005, it opens seven days a week with about a 305 girls working there in shifts. In an attempt to prevent human trafficking, only women with EU passports can work there and there are biometric keypads to the rooms so there can be no subletting. Each room has a panic button in case of trouble.

Charleroi
Prostitution in Charleroi formerly took place in various places over the city. In 2002 the council limited the activity to a small area, known as the "Charleroi Triangle" (intersection of rue du Moulin, rue de Marchienne, rue Arthur Pater, rue de la Fenderie and place Rucloux). The city started planning to redevelop the "Lower City", including the Triangle, and in 2011 the trade was forced to relocate to the area around the ministère des Finances (rue des Rivages, rue Monnet, la place des Tramways and rue du Grand Central). The new area was thought to be less secure than the triangle by the prostitutes and attempts were made to move back to the old area.

Street prostitution was prevalent in Gosselie on the northern outskirts of Charleroi. In June 2011 this was limited to the area behind the TEC Charleroi buildings. The prostitutes disregarded this limit,  prompting a total ban on street prostitution in 2014. Also in Gosselie are some drinking establishments where prostitution is allowed. These are on faubourg de Bruxelles and the N5.

Deinze
In Deinze there are a few windows along the Kortrijksesteenweg (N43). The road has been nicknamed "Rue d'amour".

Ghent

There are two red-light districts in Ghent, located close to each other. The larger is in Schepenenvijverstraat and Pieter Vanderdoncktdoorgang including Glazen Straatje (a glass roofed arcade). There are just under 70 windows here. The second area is situated in Belgradostraat, and has about 30 windows.

Following pressure from locals, the prostitutes in the windows in Ghent dress in a respectable fashion.

Liège
Rue Varin, in the Liège-Cathédrale quarter of Liège, had been a centre on prostitution since the 19th century. The area was partially demolished in the early 2000s for the rebuilding of Liège-Guillemins railway station. The remaining building were renovated as part of the gentrification of the area and prostitution stopped.

There was a window area in Liège centred around Rue du Champion and Rue de l’Agneau near the River Meuse's west bank. This was shut in 2009. Street prostitution has been a problem in this area and also around Grand Poste since the windows were closed. Following the shutting of the windows, about 180 prostitutes moved to Seraing. In 2009, the council announced an intention to build an "Eros Centre" for the prostitutes to work in, but this was cancelled in 2015.

Ostend
There have been windows in various streets in the docklands area of Ostend - Langestraat, Hazegras, Fregatstraat, Vrijhavenstraat and Oesterbankstraat. Ostend council have been trying to clean the area up and many establishments have closed.

Seraing
There are a number of windows in rue Marnix, Seraing. There were about 100 prostitutes working there until the shutting of the windows in Liège, when about 180 prostitutes moved to Seraing.

The council plan to stop prostitution in rue Marnix and build a new "Eros Centre". The centre will have 34 working rooms, a medical office, police station and a car park. Activities within the centre will be screened from the passing public.

Sint-Truiden
There are a number of windows along Luikersteenweg, Sint-Truiden. It is known locally as "Chaussée d'Amour". Currently, there are 42 brothel permits issued, but the mayor of Sint-Truiden wants to tighten up on the establishments. Weekly checks on working conditions and work permits are carried out by the local police.

Further reading

See also
 Prostitution in Belgium
 Red-light district
 List of red-light districts

References

 
Prostitution in Belgium